Earth, Wind & Fire (EW&F or EWF) is an American band whose music spans the genres of jazz, R&B, soul, funk, disco, pop, Latin, and Afro pop. They are among the best-selling bands of all time, with sales of over 90 million records worldwide.

The band was founded in Chicago by Maurice White in 1969, growing out of the Salty Peppers. Prominent members have included Philip Bailey, Verdine White, Ralph Johnson, Larry Dunn, Al McKay, Roland Bautista, Robert Brookins, Sonny Emory, Fred Ravel, Ronnie Laws, Sheldon Reynolds and Andrew Woolfolk. The band is known for its kalimba sound, dynamic horn section, energetic and elaborate stage shows, and the contrast between Bailey's falsetto and Maurice's baritone.

The band has won 6 Grammys out of 17 nominations and four American Music Awards out of 12 nominations. They have been inducted into the Rock and Roll Hall of Fame, the Vocal Group Hall of Fame, the NAACP Image Award Hall of Fame, and Hollywood's Rockwalk, and earned a star on the Hollywood Walk of Fame. The band has received an ASCAP Rhythm & Soul Heritage Award, a BET Lifetime Achievement Award, a Soul Train Legend Award, a NARAS Signature Governor's Award, a Grammy Lifetime Achievement Award, the 2012 Congressional Horizon Award, and the Kennedy Center Honors in 2019. Rolling Stone has called them "innovative, precise yet sensual, calculated yet galvanizing" and declared that the band "changed the sound of black pop". VH1 has described EWF as "one of the greatest bands".

History

1969–1970: Beginnings
In 1969, Maurice White, a former session drummer for Chess Records and former member of the Ramsey Lewis Trio, joined two friends in Chicago, Wade Flemons and Don Whitehead, as a songwriting team. They wrote songs and commercials in the Chicago area. The three friends got a recording contract with Capitol Records. Calling themselves "The Salty Peppers", they had a marginal hit single in the Midwest titled "La La Time".

The Salty Peppers' second single, "Uh Huh Yeah", did not fare as well. Maurice moved from Chicago to Los Angeles. He added singer Sherry Scott and percussionist Yackov Ben Israel, both from Chicago, to the band. He asked his younger brother Verdine to join and on June 6, 1970, Verdine moved from Chicago to LA to become the band's bassist. Maurice began shopping demo tapes featuring Donny Hathaway to various record labels and the band eventually signed to Warner Bros. Records.

1970–1974: Formation and early years
Maurice's astrological sign, Sagittarius, has a primary elemental quality of fire and seasonal qualities of earth and air, according to classical triplicities. Sagittarius in the northern hemisphere occurs in the autumn, whose element is earth, and in the southern hemisphere, it is spring, whose element is air. Hence the omission of Water, the fourth classical element. Based on this, he changed the band's name, to "Earth, Wind & Fire". Maurice held further auditions in L.A, adding Michael Beal on guitar, Chester Washington on reeds, and Leslie Drayton on trumpet. Maurice was a percussionist and lead vocalist. Drayton served as the group's arranger. Trombonist Alex Thomas completed the then ten-man lineup. Warner Bros designated Joe Wissert to be the band's producer.

Earth, Wind & Fire 
The band's self-titled debut album was released in February 1971 on Warner Bros. The album got to No. 24 on the Billboard Top Soul Albums chart and was certified Gold in France by the SNEP.

Lester Bangs of Rolling Stone noted a "heavy Sly influence" and the "smooth harmonies" of The Fifth Dimension on the LP. Bob Talbert of the Detroit Free Press also wrote "I'm not sure what to call this group. Afro-gospel-jazz-blues-rock? Must there be a label?".

Sweet Sweetback's Baadassss Song 
EWF went on to supply the entire soundtrack of the Melvin Van Peebles feature film Sweet Sweetback's Baadasssss Song. The soundtrack, composed by Van Peebles, was released in April 1971 on Stax Records. The album reached No. 13 on the Billboard Top R&B Albums chart.

The Need of Love 
In November 1971, EWF's second album, titled The Need of Love, was issued. The LP got to No. 35 on the Billboard Top Soul Albums chart. Bruce Lindsay of Jazz Journal called The Need of Love "a worthwhile album". Al Rudis of The Chicago Sun Times wrote the LP "works beautifully and while the elements of Earth, Wind & Fire aren't new, this mixture of them is a unique sound".

A single from the album called "I Think About Lovin' You" reached No. 44 on the Billboard Hot Soul Songs chart.

The band became popular on college campuses, although some members started to become restless and the band eventually split. With only Verdine left, Maurice decided to re-form the group.

During 1972, Maurice added vocalist Helena Davis, Ronnie Laws on the flute and saxophone, rhythm guitarist Roland Bautista, keyboardist Larry Dunn, vocalist Philip Bailey and percussionist Ralph Johnson. Davis was soon replaced by Jessica Cleaves, a former member of the R&B group The Friends of Distinction.

The band successfully auditioned for managers Bob Cavallo and Joe Ruffalo. Cavallo's management of John Sebastian led to a series of gigs as his opening act. A performance at New York's Rockefeller Center introduced EWF to Clive Davis, then-President of Columbia Records. Davis was impressed and bought their contract from Warner Bros. Wissert went along with the band.

Last Days and Time 
Their debut album on CBS/Columbia Records, Last Days and Time, was issued in October 1972. The album got to No. 15 on the US Billboard Top Soul Albums chart and No. 9 on the UK Blues & Soul Top British Soul Albums chart. Paul Sexton of Record Mirror proclaimed "Musical historians and EWF fans alike will welcome" Last Days and Time. Ovid Goode Jr. of The Los Angeles Daily News declared that the LP is full of "moving tunes" that "sprouts forth with a fresh sound which sets it apart from many of the ho-hum aggregations around today".

A single called "Mom" got to No. 39 on the Cashbox Top R&B Singles chart.

Soon thereafter, Roland Bautista and Ronnie Laws left. Denver native Philip Bailey recommended his former East High School classmate, saxophonist Andrew Woolfolk as a replacement for Laws. Woolfolk had been busy in New York studying sax with sax maestro Joe Henderson and was due to start a career in banking at the time. To fill the void created by Bautista's departure, rhythm guitarists Al McKay and Johnny Graham were added. Graham previously played with New Birth, while McKay was a former member of the Ike and Tina Turner Revue and The Watts 103rd St. Rhythm Band.

Head to the Sky 
EWF's fourth studio album, Head to the Sky, was released in May 1973. The album rose to No. 2 on the Billboard Top Soul Albums chart and No. 27 on the Billboard 200 chart. Head to the Sky was certified US Platinum by the RIAA.

Vince Aletti of Rolling Stone declared that EWF "sound like a cosmic choir and generate a Sly Stone effect" on an album that's "certainly beyond all expectations". Variety also described the record as "a movin' new package."

A single off the LP titled "Evil" got to No. 19 on the Billboard Adult Contemporary Songs and No. 25 on the Billboard Hot Soul Songs charts respectively. Another single called
"Keep Your Head to the Sky" rose to No. 23 on the Billboard Hot Soul Songs chart. Jessica Cleaves left after the album release.

Open Our Eyes 
The band's follow-up album was co-produced by Maurice and Wissert. This LP was recorded at Colorado's Caribou Ranch Studio and Open Our Eyes was released in March 1974. Ken Emerson of Rolling Stone called Open Our Eyes "a pleasant miscellany of Africana, Latin rhythms, well-mannered funk, smooth jazz, Sly Stone, Stevie Wonder and the Fifth Dimension". The Village Voices Robert Christgau described the album as a complete "tour de force". The album rose to No. 1 on the Billboard Top Soul Albums chart and No. 15 on the Billboard 200 chart. Open Our Eyes was certified US Platinum.

A single from the LP called "Mighty Mighty" reached No. 4 on the Billboard Hot Soul Songs chart and No. 29 on the Billboard Hot 100 chart. "Kalimba Story" rose to No. 6 on the Billboard Hot Soul Songs chart. "Devotion" got to No. 23 on the Billboard Hot Soul Songs chart and No. 33 on the Billboard Hot 100 chart.

After Open Our Eyes was issued, Maurice's younger brother, Fred White, joined the band. He had previously played in Chicago clubs as a drummer with Donny Hathaway and Little Feat.

On April 6, 1974, EWF performed at the California Jam, a West Coast rock festival that attracted an audience of 200,000. The concert was televised in the US on May 10, 1974, by ABC.

Another Time 
In September 1974, a compilation double album titled Another Time with all the songs from EWF's first two studio albums was released by Warner Bros. The album got to No. 29 on the Billboard Top Soul Albums chart.

The band collaborated with Ramsey Lewis on his album Sun Goddess, which was produced by Maurice and issued in late 1974 by Columbia. The album got to No. 1 on the Billboard Top Soul Albums chart and No. 12 on the Billboard 200 chart. The LP's title track rose to No. 20 on the Billboard Hot Soul Songs chart.
Sun Goddess was certified US Gold.

1975–1980: Ornate sound

That's the Way of the World 
During 1975, EWF was approached by Sig Shore, producer of the motion picture Super Fly, to record the soundtrack to a new film titled That's the Way of the World. With a screenplay from Robert Lipsyte, the film was produced and directed by Shore. The film starred Harvey Keitel, Ed Nelson, EWF as "The Group" and Maurice as Early, "The Group"'s leader. Keitel played the role of a record producer who hears "The Group" performing and is wowed by their act.

When the band saw the film they were convinced that it would become a box office bomb, which it eventually was. They therefore released the film's soundtrack before the film's premiere. The LP was produced by White and Charles Stepney and recorded at the Caribou Ranch Studio. Stepney had previously worked with artists such as the Dells, Terry Callier and Minnie Riperton and the Rotary Connection, of which Riperton was a member. Stepney's writing and production style included a more ornate, orchestral flourish, which influenced the soundtrack album.

That's the Way of the World was eventually issued in March 1975 by Columbia. The album rose to No. 1 on both the Billboard 200 and Billboard Top Soul Albums charts. Stephen Curwood of The Boston Globe called the LP "a sound you shouldn't miss." Daryl Easlea of the BBC described That's the Way of the World as a "soul masterpiece." The album was certified US triple platinum.

From the LP came the single "Shining Star", which rose to No. 1 on both the Billboard Hot 100 and Hot Soul Singles charts. This made EWF the first black act to top both the Billboard album and singles charts. The song won a Grammy Award for Best R&B Performance by a Duo or Group with Vocals. The album's second single was title track "That's the Way of the World". It reached No. 5 on the Billboard Hot Soul Singles chart and No. 12 on the Hot 100 chart.

With the album's success the band was able to hire their own horn section, dubbed the Phenix Horns. They were composed of saxophonist Don Myrick, trombonist Louis Satterfield, and trumpeters Rahmlee Davis and Michael Harris. Myrick and Satterfield had both previously worked with White during his days as a session drummer at Chess Records.

Gratitude 
After their first European tour, EWF returned to the studio in June 1975. The band eventually came away with an album of mostly live concert material together with some new tracks. As a double LP Gratitude was issued in November 1975. It rose to No. 1 on both the Billboard 200 and Top Soul Albums charts respectively. The album was certified US triple platinum.

With the LP came "Sing a Song", which rose to numbers 1 and 5 on the Billboard Hot Soul Songs and Hot 100 charts, respectively. "Can't Hide Love" got to No. 11 on the Billboard Hot Soul Songs chart. "Can't Hide Love" was Grammy nominated for Best Arrangement For Voices. The album's title track was also nominated for a Grammy in the category of Best R&B Performance by a Duo or Group with Vocals.

During 1975, White established a production company called Kalimba Productions. He signed artists such as his former bandleader Ramsey Lewis; singer Deniece Williams, who had once been a member of Stevie Wonder's "Wonderlove" backup group; and girl group the Emotions. Maurice loaned the band's signature Phenix Horns and most of the other band members and put these and others Kalimba artists on tour with EWF.

While co-producing and arranging EWF's follow-up LP, Williams's debut album, This Is Niecy, Ramsey Lewis's Salongo, and the Emotions' Flowers, their first album on Columbia Records, Charles Stepney died of a heart attack on May 17, 1976, in Chicago at the age of 45.

Spirit 
With Stepney's death, White went on to produce the band's new LP, Spirit, which was issued in October 1976. The album's title paid tribute to Stepney. The LP rose to No. 2 on both the Billboard Top Pop Albums and Top Soul Albums charts. Craig Werner of Vibe called Spirit "one of the group's defining moments" and "gospel soul for the ages."John Rockwell of The New York Times declared "what is most interesting about Maurice White and his musicians..is their refusal to be locked into any stylistic format." Spirit was certified US double platinum.

"Getaway" reached No. 1 on the Billboard Hot Soul Songs chart. The song also rose to No. 12 on both the Billboard Hot 100 and Dance Club Play charts. "Saturday Nite" reached numbers 4 and 21 on the Billboard Hot Soul Songs and Hot 100 charts, respectively. "Saturday Nite" rose to No. 12 on both the Billboard Dance Club Songs and UK Pop Singles charts, respectively. "Earth, Wind and Fire" was Grammy nominated for Best Instrumental Composition.

During this period, EWF concerts became loaded with pyrotechnics, magic, laser lights, flying pyramids, levitating guitarists and elaborate production tricks that included the entire group ascending in a pyramid and a disappearing act. Stage magician Doug Henning appeared on many of their tours with his assistant and eventual successor, David Copperfield. George Faison began choreographing the shows.

All'n All 
In November 1977, EWF released All 'n All, their eighth studio album. It was inspired by Maurice's month-long trip through Argentina and Brazil. The album rose to No. 1 on the Billboard Top Soul Albums chart and No. 3 on the Billboard 200 chart. John Rockwell of The New York Times declared "All 'n All shows Maurice White and his cohorts pushing their music ever more in a febrile jazz‐rock direction." Monroe Anderson of the Chicago Tribune called the album as a "rare blend of poetry, passion and artistic progression."

All 'n All won a Grammy for Best R&B Vocal Performance By A Duo, Group Or Chorus. The album was certified US triple platinum.

"Serpentine Fire" rose to No. 1 on the Billboard Hot Soul Songs chart and No. 13 on the Billboard Hot 100. "Fantasy" reached No. 12 on the Billboard Hot Soul Songs chart and No. 14 on the UK Singles Chart. "Fantasy" was Grammy-nominated for Best R&B Song. "Runnin" won a Grammy for Best R&B Instrumental.

In April 1978, the band featured on Natalie Cole's special aired on CBS where they performed a medley.

EWF also appeared in the July 1978 feature film Sgt. Pepper's Lonely Hearts Club Band where they performed a cover of the Beatles' "Got to Get You into My Life". The song was eventually added to the film's soundtrack. However, the film was a commercial failure. EWF's rendition of "Got to Get You into My Life" was the biggest hit from the soundtrack, reaching No. 1 on the Billboard R&B songs chart and No. 9 on the Billboard Pop singles chart. The song was Grammy-nominated for Best Pop Vocal Performance by a Duo, Group or Chorus. It went on to win a Grammy for Best Instrumental Arrangement Accompanying Vocalist(s). The film's soundtrack was certified US platinum.

The Best of Earth, Wind & Fire, Vol. 1 
In 1978, White established a vanity label of CBS titled The American Record Company (ARC), and alongside sound engineer George Massenburg, a new recording studio called The Complex in West Los Angeles. In November 1978, EWF issued a compilation album on the new vanity label entitled The Best of Earth, Wind & Fire, Vol. 1. It rose to No. 3 on the Billboard Top Soul Albums chart and No. 6 on the Billboard 200 chart. The album was certified quintuple platinum in the U.S. by the RIAA.

"September" rose to No. 1 on the Billboard Hot Soul Songs chart and No. 8 on the Billboard Hot 100. "September" also reached No. 3 on the UK Singles Chart.

In January 1979, the band performed "September" and "That's the Way of the World" at the Music for UNICEF Concert. The concert was broadcast worldwide from the United Nations General Assembly. Other artists who performed at the event were ABBA, Andy Gibb, the Bee Gees, Olivia Newton-John, Donna Summer and Rod Stewart. The concert was Emmy-nominated in the category of Outstanding Individual Achievement - Special Class.

I Am 
During June 1979, EWF issued their ninth studio album, I Am. The LP rose to No. 1 on the Billboard Top Soul Albums chart and No. 3 on the Billboard 200 chart. I Am was certified US double platinum.

Connie Johnson of the Los Angeles Times proclaimed that the album was "freshly innovative for EWF." Eric Sieger of The Baltimore Sun described I Am as being "faultlessly produced."

"Boogie Wonderland", featuring the Emotions, got to No. 2 on the Billboard Hot Soul Songs chart and No. 6 on the Billboard Hot 100. The song was also Grammy nominated in the categories of Best Disco Recording and Best R&B Instrumental Performance.

"After the Love Has Gone" reached No. 2 on both the Billboard Hot 100 and Hot Soul Songs charts. The song made No. 3 on both the Billboard Adult Contemporary Songs and UK Pop Singles charts. The ballad was Grammy-nominated in the category of Record of the Year. "After the Love Has Gone" won a Grammy for the Best R&B Vocal Performance by a Duo or Group.

Faces 
During October 1980, EWF issued a double album titled Faces. This LP was in the emerging post-disco style and was partly recorded on the Caribbean island of Montserrat. The album rose to No. 2 on the Billboard Top Soul Albums chart and No. 10 on both the Billboard 200 and UK Albums charts. Faces was certified US gold.

In a 2007 interview, when asked which EWF album was his favorite, Maurice White replied: "Probably Faces because we were really in tune...and it gave us the opportunity to explore new areas." Soon after its release, rhythm guitarist Al McKay left the band.

Dennis Hunt of the Los Angeles Times declared "Faces is the R&B album of the year." Chuck Pratt of the Chicago Sun Times exclaimed "this fine funk soul group puts its best face forward on this ambitious and generous double pocket set of intricately produced, high gloss funk."

A song off the LP titled "Let Me Talk" reached No. 8 on the Billboard R&B Singles chart and No. 29 on the UK Singles Chart. Another single called "You" got to No. 10 on the Billboard Hot R&B Singles chart and No. 30 on the Billboard Adult Contemporary Songs chart. "And Love Goes On" rose to No. 15 on the Billboard R&B Singles chart.

1981–1996: Electric sound

Raise! 
White decided that, given the changing musical landscape, the band needed to incorporate into their work more of the electronic sound which was popular at the time. As a result, EWF's eleventh album, Raise!, was influenced by this new electronic sound and released in the Autumn of 1981. With this album rhythm guitarist Roland Bautista returned to EWF. Bautista went on to give the band's sound a bit of a hard rock feel with his playing. Raise! rose to No. 1 on the Billboard Top R&B Albums chart and No. 5 on the Billboard 200 chart. Raise was certified US Platinum.

Ken Tucker of Rolling Stone described Raise! as a reflection of "street-gritty black pop". J.D. Considine of The Baltimore Sun noted that the album puts "Earth, Wind & Fire back on the rock and roll road".

"Let's Groove" reached No. 1 on the Billboard Hot R&B Songs chart and No. 3 on the Billboard Hot 100 chart. This song was nominated for a Grammy in the category of Best R&B Performance by a Duo or Group with Vocals.

"I've Had Enough", got to No. 29 on the UK Pop Singles chart. "Wanna Be With You" also rose to No. 15 on the Billboard Hot Soul Singles chart. "Wanna Be With You" won a Grammy for Best R&B Performance by a Duo or Group with Vocals. On October 30, 1981, EWF appeared at American Bandstands 30th Anniversary Special, where they performed "Let's Groove".

In 1981, the Phenix Horns also began collaborations with Phil Collins and his band Genesis.

 Powerlight 
During February 1983, EWF issued a studio album titled Powerlight. The album rose to No. 4 on the Billboard Top R&B Albums chart and No. 12 on the Billboard 200 chart. Powerlight was certified US Gold.

Connie Johnson of the Los Angeles Times wrote Powerlight "does show why EWF is one of the masters of studio pop." Hugh Wyatt of the New York Daily News found "Earth, Wind & Fire gives new meaning to the word classy, and I like it".

"Fall in Love with Me" rose to No. 17 on the Billboard Hot 100 chart and No. 4 on the Billboard Hot R&B Songs chart. "Fall in Love with Me" was Grammy-nominated for Best R&B Performance by a Duo or Group with Vocals. "Side by Side" got to No. 15 on the Billboard Hot R&B Songs chart.

EWF went on to appear on the soundtrack of the April 1983 animated feature film Rock & Rule with the song "Dance, Dance, Dance". Artists such as Debbie Harry of Blondie, Lou Reed and Cheap Trick also featured on the soundtrack. LA Weekly noted the "standout track" is "Earth, Wind & Fire's funky club jam Dance, Dance, Dance". Rock & Rule was the first feature film of Nelvana Studios. Spin called Rock & Rule "the greatest oddball scifi musical ever committed to animation cels". Keith Breese of Contact Music described the movie as "a masterpiece of outré animation and wildly ambitious vision and remains a triumph in animated feature film". Rock & Rule has also gone on to become a cult classic.

 Electric Universe 
During November 1983, EWF issued their thirteenth studio album, titled Electric Universe. With the album came a unique fully new wave and synth pop sound for EWF. The album got to No. 8 on the Billboard Top Soul Albums chart and No. 40 on the Billboard 200 chart.

Gary Graff of The Detroit Free Press exclaimed "Plug in the planets! This is the best disc this outfit has put together in quite some time." Matty Karas of Rolling Stone described Electric Universe as full of "sensuous, and at times, rock oriented dance material."

"Magnetic" rose to No. 10 on the Billboard Hot R&B Songs chart and No. 36 on the Billboard Dance Club Songs chart. "Touch" got to No. 23 on the Billboard Hot R&B Songs chart.

 Hiatus 
Maurice decided the band needed a break, so he put EWF on hiatus in 1984.

During the hiatus, Maurice produced Barbra Streisand's 1984 album Emotion. He produced Ramsey Lewis on his 1985 album Fantasy. The album reached No. 13 on the Cashbox Jazz Albums chart. White released a self-titled solo album in 1985 on Columbia. The album rose to number 12 on the Billboard Top R&B Albums chart. A cover of Ben E. King's "Stand by Me" got to No. 6 on the Billboard Hot R&B Singles chart and No. 11 on the Billboard Adult Contemporary Songs chart. Another album cut, "I Need You", rose to No. 20 on the Billboard Adult Contemporary Songs chart and No. 30 on the Billboard Hot R&B Singles chart. White co-produced Pieces of a Dream's 1986 LP Joyride. The album reached No. 3 on the Billboard Traditional Jazz Albums chart and No. 18 on the Billboard Top Soul Albums chart. He then produced Neil Diamond's 1986 album Headed for the Future. White later guested on guitarist Lee Ritenour's 1986 Grammy-nominated album Earth Run and produced Ramsey Lewis'1987 album Keys to the City.

Philip Bailey issued his second solo album, Chinese Wall, in 1984 on Columbia. He recorded Grammy nominated Gospel LP entitled The Wonders of His Love in 1984 and appeared upon Kenny Loggins' 1985 album Vox Humana. In 1986 Bailey released his third studio album being Inside Out and his second Gospel LP, Triumph, which won a Grammy. Bailey later featured on Stevie Wonder's 1986 album In Square Circle and Ray Parker Jr.'s 1987 LP After Dark.

Ralph Johnson produced The Temptations on their 1984 album Truly for You. Verdine White promoted go-go bands such as Trouble Funk and E.U. The compilation album The Collection was released in 1986. It stayed at No. 5 on the UK singles charts for two weeks, and was certified Gold by the British Phonographic Industry.

 Touch the World 
During 1987, Maurice went about reconvening the band. Verdine, Johnson, Bailey and Woolfolk returned. New members guitarist/vocalist Sheldon Reynolds, keyboardist Vance Taylor and drummer Sonny Emory filled out the lineup. A new horn section dubbed Earth, Wind & Fire Horns was created, made up of Gary Bias on the saxophone, Raymond Lee Brown on the trumpet, and Reggie Young on flugelhorn and trombone.

With this came the studio album Touch the World which was issued in November 1987. Touch the World rose to No. 3 on the Billboard Top R&B Albums chart and No. 33 on the Billboard 200 chart. Touch the World was also certified US Gold.

David Emerson of The Boston Globe called Touch the World "one of their toughest and most convincing records ever". Pamela Bloom of High Fidelity proclaimed "the message, as always, is stop, step back, and turn up your light". Touch the World was also nominated for a Soul Train Award in the category of Best R&B/Soul Album of the Year.

Skylark penned "System of Survival" for the album. It became a hit single, going to number one on both the Billboard R&B and Dance charts. "System of Survival" was nominated for a Soul Train Award in the category of Best R&B/Soul Single – Group, Band or Duo. "Thinking of You" got to No. 1 on the Billboard Dance Club Songs chart and No. 3 on the Billboard Hot R&B/Hip-Hop Songs chart.

 The Best of Earth, Wind & Fire, Vol. 2 
During November 1988, EWF issued a compilation album titled The Best of Earth, Wind & Fire, Vol. 2. The album was certified US Gold. "Turn on (The Beat Box)" reached No. 26 on the Billboard Hot R&B Songs chart. EWF went on to be nominated for an NAACP Image Award in the category of Best Vocal Group.

 Heritage 
During February 1990, EWF issued their fifteenth studio album, entitled Heritage. The album rose to No. 19 on the Billboard Top R&B Albums chart and No. 18 on the UK Blues & Soul Top British Soul Albums chart.

People magazine described Heritage as an album "with a full dose of energy and creativity". Don Palmer of Spin also proclaimed "EWF's newest kicks with some genuine enthusiasm".

The title track, featuring The Boys, got to No. 5 on the Billboard Hot R&B Songs chart. "For the Love of You", featuring MC Hammer, rose to No. 19 on the Billboard Hot R&B Songs chart.

The band appeared on the compilation album Music Speaks Louder Than Words released in 1990 on Epic Records. Artists such as Phoebe Snow, Roberta Flack, Cyndi Lauper, Patti LaBelle, Animotion, Atlantic Starr, and Anne Murray featured on the album. Songs were composed by both American and Soviet musicians and songwriters. A sum of the proceeds went to the AFS Intercultural Exchanges programme, an international body based in 70 countries which places exchange students with host families.

 The Eternal Dance 
During 1992, EWF issued a compilation album called The Eternal Dance. The LP was the band's first ever boxset. The Boston Globe placed The Eternal Dance on their lists of the top ten recordings of both 1992 and 1993. On July 30, 1993, former Phenix Horns saxophonist Don Myrick was fatally shot by a Santa Monica Police Department officer.

 Millenium 
During September 1993, came the release of the band's 16th studio album, Millennium issued on Warner Bros. Records. Artists such as Ronnie Laws and Prince appeared on the LP. The album also rose to No. 8 on the Billboard Top R&B Albums chart and No. 39 on the Billboard 200 chart. Millennium was certified Gold in Japan by the RIAJ.

Tom Sinclair of Vibe proclaimed that EWF "demonstrate they still have the knack for constructing mellifluous R&B on the visionary/romantic tip." Renee Graham of The Boston Globe noted that Millennium "returns the band to its funk/r&b roots" with a "tasty bit of Minneapolis funk". Millennium was nominated for a Soul Train Music Award in the category of Best R&B/Soul Album - Group, Band or Duo.

"Sunday Morning" got to No. 10 on the US Billboard Adult R&B Songs chart, No. 20 on the US Billboard Hot R&B Songs chart, No. 35 on the US Billboard Adult Contemporary Songs chart, and No. 33 on the RPM Top Canadian Singles chart. It was nominated for a Grammy in the category of Best R&B Vocal Performance by a Duo or Group. "Spend the Night" rose to No. 36 on the Billboard Adult R&B Songs chart.

On October 13 of that year, former lead vocalist Wade Flemons died from cancer in Battle Creek, Michigan.

In November 1993, EWF performed at the American Music Awards 20th anniversary special. During 1994, EWF was inducted into the NAACP Image Award Hall of Fame. On September 14 of the following year, the band received another tribute in the form of a star on the Hollywood Walk of Fame.

Maurice, Sonny Emory, Sheldon Reynolds, Bailey, Johnson, Woolfolk and Verdine all attended the inauguration ceremony.

1996–present: Neo period
During 1996, Maurice launched a new label titled Kalimba Records based in Santa Monica, California. At the label also came a recording studio known as Magnet Vision.

 In the Name of Love 
EWF's follow-up studio album, In the Name of Love, was released in 1997 on Rhino Records. The album went on to be noted as one with a digitised neo soul sound and style. Phyl Garland of Stereo Review wrote "with this set of skillfully shaped songs, White has positioned Earth, Wind & Fire to move into the next century". Dan Glaister of The Guardian described In the Name of Love as "a scorching album".  The LP reached No. 19 on the UK R&B Albums chart. From the album, a track titled "When Love Goes Wrong" got to No. 33 on the Billboard Adult R&B Songs chart. Another song called "Change Your Mind" was issued as a single in 2006 by Kalimba. "Change Your Mind" rose to No. 26 on the Billboard Adult R&B Songs chart.

During the previous year, Maurice stopped regularly touring, but still appeared on stage occasionally. He explained that he wanted rest from the rigors of the road. Bailey took the role of on stage leader. Maurice maintained executive control.

The band appeared on Wu Tang Clan offshoot Sunz of Man's 1998 debut album The Last Shall Be First. EWF gave an encore performance at the 1997 and 1998 Montreux Jazz Festivals.

During Spring 1999, EWF appeared on the soundtrack of the animated sitcom The PJs.

 The Ultimate Collection 
The band issued a compilation album titled The Ultimate Collection on Columbia. The album reached No. 34 upon the UK Pop Albums Chart. A remix by UK dance duo Phats and Small called "September '99" got to No. 1 on the Canadian Dance Songs chart and No. 25 on the UK Pop Singles chart.

In 1999, the group performed on the A&E Network show Live by Request. Website Startalk.org was set up in 1999 in Maurice's honor. Maurice later spoke of a mild affliction with Parkinson's disease. Artists such as Steven Tyler of Aerosmith, Boyz II Men, Smokey Robinson, Isaac Hayes, Michael Jackson, Eric Clapton and Tom Morello of Rage Against the Machine posted messages on the site for White. Maurice, however, had the disease under control, so much so that he occasionally made appearances at EWF performances, and continued to write, record, produce and develop new recordings.

On March 6, 2000, EWF was inducted into the Rock and Roll Hall of Fame by hip hop artist Lil' Kim to a standing ovation during the 15th annual ceremony held at New York's Waldorf-Astoria Hotel. Maurice, Bailey, Verdine, and Johnson, as well as former EWF members Al McKay, Larry Dunn, Woolfolk, Fred White and Johnny Graham attended the ceremony. At the gala they performed "Shining Star" and "That's the Way of the World".

EWF was a specially-invited music guest at the June 20, 2000 White House state dinner hosted by President Bill Clinton on the South Lawn of the White House, in honor of His Majesty Mohammed VI, King of Morocco, and Her Royal Highness Princess Lalla Meryem. So impressed was the king by the band's performance that he made a personal request for EWF to perform in Morocco for his 37th birthday celebration on August 21, 2000. EWF collaborated with Wyclef Jean on his second studio album, The Ecleftic: 2 Sides II a Book, which was issued in August 2000.

In 2001, a biographical documentary of the band titled Shining Stars: The Official Story Of Earth, Wind & Fire was released, directed by Kathryn Arnold. Following the September 11 attacks of that year, the band members donated $25,000 to the American Red Cross at a September 13 show at Virginia's Verizon Wireless Virginia Beach Amphitheater, the band's first concert following those events. February 24, 2002, saw EWF performing at the closing ceremonies of the 2002 Winter Olympics held in Salt Lake City, Utah. On June 17, 2002, EWF was bestowed with the ASCAP Rhythm & Soul Heritage Award at the Beverly Hilton Hotel in Beverly Hills, California. The award was presented by ASCAP President and Chairman Marilyn Bergman, Stevie Wonder, and Jimmy Jam. On June 25, 2002, EWF was bestowed with a BET Lifetime Achievement Award.

 The Essential Earth, Wind & Fire 
Within July 2002 a compilation album titled The Essential Earth, Wind & Fire was issued by Columbia. The album was certified US Gold. A sampler that featured remixes of "Can't Hide Love" and "Let's Groove" came off the LP. The remix sampler got to No. 4 on the UK Dance Singles Chart. A live album of the band's 1980 performance in Rio de Janeiro, Brazil, titled Live In Rio, was released in November 2002.

 The Promise 
During May 2003, EWF issued The Promise. The album peaked at No. 19 on the Billboard Top R&B/Hip-Hop Albums chart and No. 5 on the Billboard Top Independent Albums chart. People magazine described The Promise as a "musically rich 17-track set (including five trademark instrumental interludes) that blows away most of today's R&B." Steve Jones of USA Today wrote "with horn-kissed ballads and infectious jazz funk grooves, the band seems to have regained its spark". Artists such as Angie Stone, The Emotions and Gerald Albright featured on the album. "All in the Way", featuring The Emotions, got to No. 13 on the Billboard Adult R&B Songs chart and No. 25 Billboard Adult Contemporary Songs chart. "Hold Me" reached No. 28 on the Billboard Adult R&B Songs chart. "Hold Me" was Grammy-nominated in the category of Best Traditional R&B Vocal Performance.

On July 7, 2003, the band was inducted into Hollywood's Rockwalk. In September 2003, EWF were inducted into the Vocal Group Hall of Fame. On February 8, 2004, EWF performed in a tribute to funk at the 46th annual Grammy Awards held at the Staples Center, Los Angeles, California. Other artists performing at this tribute were Parliament Funkadelic, OutKast, and Robert Randolph and the Family Band. EWF sang "Shining Star" and then at Outkast's request crooned "The Way You Move" with them. Robert Randolph and the Family Band performed their single "I Need More Love" and then all of the bands teamed to sing Parliament Funkadelic's classic "Give Up the Funk (Tear the Roof off the Sucker)". EWF also covered Jimi Hendrix's "Voodoo Child (Slight Return)" on the May 2004 tribute album Power of Soul: A Tribute to Jimi Hendrix.

On June 8, 2004, EWF were bestowed with the NARAS Signature Governors Award at Los Angeles's Beverly Hills Hotel. On September 27, 2004, former Phenix Horns trombonist Louis Satterfield died, aged 67.

On December 11, 2004, EWF was honored at the first annual Grammy Jam held at Los Angeles's Wiltern Theater. At the Grammy Jam artists such as Stevie Wonder, Yolanda Adams, India Arie, George Benson, Sheila E., Kanye West, George Duke, Usher and Jill Scott paid tribute to the band via their performances. EWF performed on Dick Clark's New Year's Rockin' Eve on December 31, 2004. The February 6, 2005, Super Bowl XXXIX pregame show in Jacksonville, Florida saw the band teaming with The Black Eyed Peas to sing "Where Is the Love?" and "Shining Star".

In 2004, EWF and Chicago embarked upon a joint national tour. It yielded a DVD of a concert that took place at Los Angeles' Greek Theater titled Chicago & Earth, Wind & Fire – Live at the Greek Theatre. This DVD was released on June 28, 2005, and was certified Platinum in the US by the RIAA. Chicago and EWF later collaborated for a new recording of Chicago's ballad "If You Leave Me Now," that was included on Chicago's 2005 compilation album Love Songs. At the 57th Primetime Emmy Awards held on September 18, 2005, at Los Angeles' Shrine Auditorium, the band performed as the opening act with The Black Eyed Peas.

 Illumination 
During September 2005, Illumination, EWF's 19th studio album, was issued on Sanctuary Records. On this album EWF collaborated with artists such as will.i.am, Kelly Rowland, Outkast's Big Boi, Floetry and Brian McKnight. Illumination reached No. 8 on the Billboard Top R&B/Hip-Hop Albums chart and No. 32 on the Billboard 200 chart.

Raymond Fiore of Entertainment Weekly described the LP as a mix of "modern beats and retro, horn-lined soul". Steve Jones of USA Today noted that on the album EWF are as "vibrant as ever". Illumination received a Grammy nomination for Best R&B Album and a Soul Train Music Award nomination in the category of Best R&B-Soul Album. EWF received a NAACP Image Award nomination for Outstanding Duo or Group.

A song from the album, called "Pure Gold", reached No. 23 on the Billboard Adult Contemporary Songs chart. EWF also covered Outkast's "The Way You Move" featuring saxophonist Kenny G. The single got to No. 12 on the Billboard Adult Contemporary Songs chart. Another single titled "Show Me The Way", featuring neo soul singer Raphael Saadiq got to No. 16 on the Billboard Adult R&B Songs chart. Show Me The Way was also Grammy nominated in the category of Best R&B Performance by a Duo or Group with Vocals.

In 2006, Maurice worked with Maurice Hines, brother of famed entertainer Gregory Hines, to release the Broadway play Hot Feet. This was a jukebox musical with the theme of the music of Earth, Wind & Fire. Maurice co-wrote with Allee Willis several new songs for the play. On February 11, 2007, EWF performed "Runaway Love" alongside Mary J. Blige and Ludacris at the 49th Grammy Awards held at Los Angeles's Staples Center.

Interpretations: Celebrating the Music of Earth, Wind & Fire, an album featuring cover versions of EWF's material, was released in March 2007 on Stax Records. Executively produced by Maurice, the LP featured artists such as Chaka Khan, Kirk Franklin, Lalah Hathaway, Mint Condition, Dwele, Meshell Ndegeocello, and Angie Stone. The album rose to no. 28 on the Billboard Top R&B/Hip-Hop Albums chart. Kirk Franklin's cover of September reached No. 17 on the Billboard Adult R&B Songs chart and No. 26 on the Billboard Hot Gospel Songs chart. Dwele's rendition of "That's the Way of the World" and Meshell Ndegeocello's cover of "Fantasy" were each nominated for Grammies in the category of Best Urban/Alternative Performance.

On April 25, 2007, EWF performed as the opening act at a special edition of American Idol entitled "Idol Gives Back". At the gala the band performed a medley of "Boogie Wonderland", "Shining Star" and "September". At the Nobel Peace Prize Concert in Oslo, Norway, on December 11, 2007, EWF performed "Fantasy" and "September". The concert was broadcast to over 100 countries. Artists such as Melissa Etheridge, Alicia Keys, Annie Lennox, and Kylie Minogue also performed at the concert.

During February 2008, EWF performed on the opening night of one of the oldest and largest musical festivals in Latin America, Chile's Viña del Mar Festival. The audience at the gala was so impressed by EWF's performance that the band was bestowed with the Gaviota de Plata (The Silver Seagull), the festival's highest performance award. EWF's song "In the Stone" has been used for several years as the introductory theme for festival broadcasts.

On March 10, 2008, the band was inducted into the Munich Olympic Walk Of Stars. During May 2008 EWF performed at the Apollo Theater's fourth annual Hall of Fame induction ceremony. Maurice and Verdine, Johnson, and Bailey each received an honorary degree from the Arts and Media College at Columbia College Chicago's 2008 commencement exercises. During the ceremony Verdine and Johnson both gave acceptance speeches before the four gave an impromptu performance of "Shining Star". EWF performed at the opening ceremony of the 2008 US Open, which was hosted by Forest Whitaker and served to commemorate the 40th anniversary of the founding of tennis' Open Era with a parade of more than 25 former US Open singles champions.

EWF performed at the White House on February 22, 2009, for the Governors' Dinner; they were the first musical artists to perform there after Barack Obama took office. During April 2009 former EWF keyboardist Robert Brookins died from a heart attack, at the age of 46. On April 26, 2009, EWF appeared at the 39th New Orleans Jazz & Heritage Festival. The band aligned with Chicago once again for a joint tour. In September 2009 EWF were bestowed with the Daniel L. Stephenson award for lifetime achievement in music at the Temecula Valley International Film and Music Festival.

During February 2010 the band participated in the recording of the "We Are the World 25 for Haiti" single. Within that year Maurice, Verdine, and Bailey together with former EWF members McKay and Dunn were inducted into the Songwriter's Hall of Fame.

In November 2011, the band received the Legend Award at the Soul Train Awards at Atlanta, Georgia's Fox Theatre. In 2012, EWF were bestowed with a Lifetime Achievement Award at the 20th Annual Trumpet Awards, held at Cobb Energy Performing Arts Centre in Atlanta. On February 29, 2012, former EWF rhythm guitarist Roland Bautista died, at the age of 60.

EWF, along with former Pussycat Doll Melody Thornton and Charlie Wilson, guested on the LL Cool J track "Something About You". The song appeared on his 2013 album Authentic.

 Now, Then & Forever 
Now, Then & Forever, the group's first album in eight years, was released on September 10, 2013, by Legacy Recordings/Sony Music. Artists such as Siedah Garrett, former bandmate Larry Dunn and Terrence Blanchard made guest appearances upon the LP. The album was also the first without musical input from founder Maurice White, although he contributed to the it's liner notes. The album reached No. 25 on the UK Pop Album Charts, No. 11 on the US Billboard 200 and No. 6 on the US Top R&B/Hip-Hop Albums chart. Now, Then & Forever was also certified Silver in the UK by the BPI.

Emerys Baird of Blues & Soul gave a nine out of ten rating, calling the album a "glorious return to form. EW&F have produced an incredibly well balanced body of work, a set full of contrast and colour, sublime stuff." Elias Leight of Popmatters also wrote "Now, Then & Forever has all the old colors and grooves, an impeccable rhythm section, prominent guitars, and indomitable horns that trace and re-trace motifs, dancing rings around everything."

A song from the album called "Guiding Lights" was released as a single and rose to No. 16 on the Billboard Smooth Jazz Songs chart and No. 30 on the Billboard Adult R&B Songs chart. Another single, "My Promise", reached No. 28 on the Billboard Adult R&B Songs chart and No. 30 on the Billboard Adult Contemporary Songs chart.

Singles Never and Why?, from The Promise, were later issued in 2014. "Never" rose to No. 17 on the Billboard Smooth Jazz Songs chart. "Why?" got to No. 19 on the Billboard Smooth Jazz Songs chart.

 Holiday 
On January 13, 2014, former percussionist Beloyd Taylor, who co-wrote the band's 1976 hit "Getaway", died. During February 2014 EWF performed alongside Pharrell, Janelle Monae at the 2014 NBA All-Star Game. On May 2, former lead vocalist Jessica Cleaves died at age 65.

On September 13, 2014, EWF performed at Proms in the Park at Hyde Park with the BBC Concert Orchestra. On October 21, 2014, EWF released their first ever holiday album, titled Holiday. That album rose to No. 26 on the Billboard Top R&B/Hip Hop Albums chart and No. 8 on the Billboard Holiday Albums chart. On December 8, 2014, EWF performed at the Kennedy Center Honors, honoring Al Green. On December 14, 2014, the band performed at the Christmas in Washington event.

Maurice White died on February 4, 2016. He was survived by his wife, his two sons, daughter and his brothers Verdine and Fred. Along with EWF, Maurice was posthumously bestowed with a Grammy Lifetime Achievement Award at the annual Grammy Awards ceremony on February 15, 2016. At the ceremony Stevie Wonder and Pentatonix performed a rendition of "That's the Way of the World" in tribute to White. On December 4 of that year, the band were also honoured with a Ebony Lifetime Achievement Award at the Ebony Power 100 Gala held in the Beverly Hilton in Beverly Hills, California.

On June 6, 2017, EWF performed in downtown Nashville, Tennessee at the CMT concert series program, CMT Crossroads, with artists such as Dan + Shay, Martina McBride, Rascall Flatts, Antebellum, Darius Rucker and Sara Evans. A performance of "September" with Antebellum on the show was nominated for a CMT Music Award in the category of Performance of the Year. During Summer 2017 the band went on a North American tour entitled, 2054-The Tour, with Chic.

EWF went on to perform on the forum float at the 2018 Rose Parade held in Pasadena, California. On May 2, 2018, the band started a Las Vegas Residency at the Venetian Theatre, Las Vegas, Nevada.

On September 10, 2019, The Los Angeles City Council declared that September 21 would be dedicated Earth, Wind & Fire Day. On November 22 of that year the band received the Portrait of a Nation Prize at the Smithsonian's American Portrait Gala. EWF were one of the inductees at the 42nd Kennedy Center Honors that took place on December 7, 2019. EWF became the first Black group to be inducted into Kennedy Honors. The band later guested on Meghan Trainor's October 2020 "Christmas Album A Very Trainor Christmas".

During September 2021, EWF reached the top 10 of Billboard's Adult R&B Airplay chart for the first time in 28 years with their new single “You Want My Love,” featuring Lucky Daye. On 24 April 2022, former saxophonist Andrew Woolfolk passed away at the age of 71. The band later embarked on a joint summer tour with Carlos Santana and made a guest appearance on the Isley Brothers' September 2022 album Make Me Say It Again, Girl.

On January 1, 2023, it was announced that former drummer Fred White had died at 67.

In March 2023, Earth, Wind & Fire IP, LLC filed a lawsuit for copyright infringement and trademark dilution against Substantial Music Group and Stellar Communications which had launched an Earth, Wind & Fire Legacy Reunion group.

Earth, Wind & Fire will tour in 2023 as co-headliners with Lionel Richie.

Legacy
Earth, Wind & Fire's songs have been covered by artists including Whitney Houston, D'Angelo, Donny Osmond, Patti LaBelle, Taylor Swift, Olly Murs, Kirk Franklin, Wynonna Judd, Maxine Nightingale, Yolanda Adams, Ledisi, Miki Howard, Chicago, Chaka Khan and 112.

EWF has been sampled by artists such as Drake, A Tribe Called Quest, Missy Elliott, Public Enemy, Snoop Dogg, Jay-Z, the Fugees, LL Cool J, Kid Ink, Salt-N-Pepa and Basement Jaxx. The band has also been sampled by the likes of Björk, Diddy, The Roots, Will Smith, Nas, TLC, Common, Lupe Fiasco, Big Sean, Tupac Shakur and MC Lyte.

EWF has influenced artists such as Beyoncé, Usher, will.i.am, Janelle Monáe, Mary J. Blige, Prince, Pharrell Williams, India Arie, Jon Secada, and Wyclef Jean. They have also been influential to artists like Angie Stone, Patrice Rushen, The All-American Rejects, Nelly Teena Marie, Musiq Soulchild, Solange Knowles, Babyface, Taylor Dayne, Will Gregory of Goldfrapp, Outkast, and Gloria Estefan.

Artists such as Jamiroquai, Melissa Etheridge, Pitbull, Lenny Kravitz,Vanessa Williams, Joe Jonas of the Jonas Brothers, Justice Omarion, Rob Bourdon of Linkin Park, Jill Scott, and Justin Timberlake have also been influenced by EWF. The band has influenced artists such as Bonnie Raitt, Erykah Badu, Jamie Foxx, Patrick Stump of Fall Out Boy, Lalah Hathaway, Amy Winehouse, and Meghan Trainor.

Miles Davis described EWF as his "all time favorite band", saying, "they have everything (horns, electric guitar, singers and more) in one band". Quincy Jones proclaimed himself to be the "biggest fan of Earth, Wind & Fire since day one." Alicia Keys proclaimed EWF as being "the best band ever". Dionne Warwick named Earth, Wind & Fire her favorite group of all time. Mark Ronson proclaimed that he loves "anything by Earth, Wind & Fire".

In the movie Baadasssss!, the actor Khalil Kain portrayed a young Maurice White leading the early incarnation of Earth, Wind & Fire. Released at the Sundance Film Festival, the film was based on Melvin Van Peebles' struggle to film and distribute the movie Sweet Sweetback's Baadasssss Song and was directed by his son Mario Van Peebles.

Members

 Philip Bailey – lead vocals, conga, percussion, kalimba (1972–1984; 1987–present)
 Verdine White – bass guitar, backing vocals (1970–1984; 1987–present)
 Ralph Johnson – percussion, backing vocals (1972–1984; 1987–present); drums (1972–1984)

with

 B. David Whitworth – percussion, vocals (1996–present)
 Myron McKinley – keyboards, musical director (2001–present)
 John Paris – drums, vocals (2001–present)
 Philip Bailey, Jr. – vocals, percussion (2008–present)
 Morris O'Connor – lead guitar, vocals (2008–present)
 Serg Dimitrijevic – rhythm guitar, vocals (2012–present)

Awards and nominations

DiscographyStudio albums'''
 Earth, Wind & Fire (1971)
 The Need of Love (1971)
 Last Days and Time (1972)
 Head to the Sky (1973)
 Open Our Eyes (1974)
 That's the Way of the World (1975)
 Spirit (1976)
 All 'n All (1977)
 I Am (1979)
 Faces (1980)
 Raise! (1981)
 Powerlight (1983)
 Electric Universe (1983)
 Touch the World (1987)
 Heritage (1990)
 Millennium (1993)
 In the Name of Love (1997)
 The Promise (2003)
 Illumination (2005)
 Now, Then & Forever (2013)
 Holiday (2014)
 The Classic Christmas Album (2015)

 See also 
 List of best-selling music artists
 List of number-one hits (United States)
 List of artists who reached number one in the United States
 List of number-one dance hits (United States)
 List of artists who reached number one on the U.S. dance chart

References

Further reading
 
 Mulhern, Tom. Bass Heroes: Styles, Stories & Secrets of 30 Great Bass Players: From the Pages of Guitar Player Magazine. Backbeat Books, 1993. 
 Payne, Jim. Weinger, Harry. The Great Drummers of R&B, Funk & Soul''. Mel Bay Publications, 2007.

External links

 
 
 

 

1970 establishments in Illinois
American funk musical groups
American soul musical groups
Columbia Records artists
Grammy Lifetime Achievement Award winners
Musical groups established in 1970
Musical groups from Chicago
Warner Records artists
Kennedy Center honorees